Yelgondaguda sometimes written as Elgondaguda is a village and panchayat in Ranga Reddy district, Telangana, India. It falls under Shabad mandal.  Cherlaguda, Aspalliguda and Mirapur are the other villages in this panchayat.

Villages in Ranga Reddy district